Cyclin-dependent kinase 5 activator 1 is an enzyme that in humans is encoded by the CDK5R1 gene.

Function 

The protein encoded by this gene (p35) is a neuron-specific activator of cyclin-dependent kinase 5 (CDK5); the activation of CDK5 is required for proper development of the central nervous system. The p35 form of this protein is proteolytically cleaved by calpain, generating a p25 form. The cleavage of p35 into p25 results in relocalization of the protein from the cell periphery to nuclear and perinuclear regions. P25 deregulates CDK5 activity by prolonging its activation and changing its cellular location. The p25 form accumulates in the brain neurons of patients with Alzheimer's disease. This accumulation correlates with an increase in CDK5 kinase activity, and may lead to aberrantly phosphorylated forms of the microtubule-associated protein tau, which contributes to Alzheimer's disease.

In melanocytic cells CDK5R1 gene expression may be regulated by MITF.

Interactions 
CDK5R1 has been shown to interact with:
 Actinin, alpha 1
 Amphiphysin,
 Beta-catenin,
 CAMK2A, 
 CDK5RAP2,
 Cyclin-dependent kinase 5,
 Protein SET,

See also
 CDK5RAP1
 CDK5RAP2
 CDK5RAP3

References

Further reading

External links